The 2000 Bulldogs RLFC season was the 66th in the club's history. Coached by Steve Folkes and captained by Darren Britt, they competed in the National Rugby League's 2000 Telstra Premiership, finishing the regular season 11th.

Squad movement

Gains

Debuts
 Braith Anasta
 Willie Mason
 Brent Sherwin

Losses

Left club/did not play in 2000
Barry Berrigan

See also
 List of Canterbury-Bankstown Bulldogs seasons

References

Canterbury-Bankstown Bulldogs seasons
Canterbury-Bankstown Bulldogs season